Egon Terzetta (Bulgarian: Егон Терцета) (2 July 1899 Valona, Ottoman Empire, modern-day Albania - 16 August 1964 Genoa, Italy) was an Italian football player who played for SK Ticha and SC Vladislav from Varna, Bulgaria.

Terzetta was born into a family of old Venetian descent. At age 9, Egon was sent to the Military Academy of Vienna (Militar Oberrealschule – Marburg), where he graduated at 18. He followed in his father's footsteps, becoming a shipping agent. Due to his work he traveled to many Mediterranean and Black Sea ports.

Terzetta finally settled in the Black Sea port city of Varna, Bulgaria. Here he demonstrated his football talent, initially playing for SK Ticha. After a rift within membership, Terzetta joined Boris Stavrev, Andrej Ivanov, and Petar Hristov on a new team, Sport Club Vladislav, which formed from the splitting of Sport Club Granit. With Vladislav, Terzetta won the first ever Tsar's Cup in 1925, captaining the team to its first Championship title. He also scored the second goal in a 2-0 victory in the final match against Levski Sofia. Terzetta was the team's captain also in its second successive Championship winning final in 1926. His career came to an abrupt end after he suffered an injury few days before the final match in 1928. Egon Terzetta married Russian white émigré Tamara Pelehin. The couple had a daughter Alicia, born in 1930. After the communist take over in Bulgaria, the family moved to Italy and settled in Genoa where Egon resumed his career as a shipping agent. He died peacefully in his sleep on 16 August 1964 and is buried in the Monumental Cemetery of Staglieno in Genoa.

References

1899 births
1964 deaths
Italian expatriates in Bulgaria
Italian footballers
Sport in Varna, Bulgaria
Footballers from Vlorë
Albanian footballers
Bulgarian footballers
Association footballers not categorized by position